In computing,  is a command in various command-line interpreters (shells) such as COMMAND.COM, cmd.exe, 4DOS/4NT and Windows PowerShell used to display the contents of specified files on the computer terminal.

Implementations

The command is available in the operating systems DEC RT-11, OS/8, RSX-11, TOPS-10, TOPS-20, VMS, Digital Research CP/M, MP/M, MetaComCo TRIPOS, Heath Company HDOS, AmigaDOS, DOS, FlexOS, TSL PC-MOS, SpartaDOS X, IBM/Toshiba 4690 OS, IBM OS/2, Microsoft Windows, ReactOS, AROS, and SymbOS. 

The type command is supported by Tim Paterson's SCP 86-DOS. On MS-DOS, the command is available in  versions 1 and later. DR DOS 6.0 also includes an implementation of the  command.

It is also available in the open source MS-DOS emulator DOSBox and the EFI shell.

In Windows PowerShell,  is a predefined command alias for the  Cmdlet which basically serves the same purpose.  originated as an internal command in 86-DOS.

The command-syntax and feature set between operating systems and command shell implementations can differ as can be seen in the following examples.

DEC RT-11 
In Digital Equipment Corporation's RT-11, the command accepts up to six input file specifications. Multiple file specifications are separated with commas.

The default filetype is .LST. Wildcards are accepted in place of filenames or filetypes.

Syntax 
The command-syntax on RT-11 is:
 TYPE[/options] filespecs
 COPIES:n – Specify the number of times the file will be typed
 DELETE – Delete the file after typing it
 LOG – Log the names of the files typed
 NEWFILES – Only files dated with the current system date will be typed
 NOLOG – Suppress the log of the files typed
 QUERY – Require confirmation before typing each file
 WAIT – Wait for user response before proceeding with the type

Examples 
 TYPE/COPIES:3 REPORT

 TYPE/NEWFILES *.LST

DR CP/M, MP/M, FlexOS 
In Digital Research CP/M, the command expands tabs and line-feed characters (CTRL-I), assuming tab positions are set at every eighth column.

The command does not support wildcard characters on FlexOS.

Syntax 
The command-syntax on CP/M is:
 TYPE ufn

Note: ufn = unambiguous file reference

In MP/M, the command has a pause mode. It is specified by entering a 'P' followed by two decimal digits after the filename. The specified number of lines will be displayed and then the command will pause until a carriage return is entered.

Examples 
A>TYPE FILE.PLM 

A>TYPE B:X.PRN 

0A>TYPE CODE.ASM P23

TSL PC-MOS 
The Software Link's PC-MOS includes an implementation of TYPE. Like the rest of the operating system, it is licensed under the GPL v3.
It supports an option to display the file content in hexadecimal form.

Syntax 
The command-syntax on PC-MOS is:

 .TYPE filename [/h]

filename – The name of the file to display
/h – Display content in hexadecimal form

Examples 
[A:\].TYPE FILE.BIN /h

Microsoft Windows, OS/2, ReactOS 

The command supports wildcard characters. In Microsoft Windows and OS/2 it includes the filename in the output when typing multiple files.

Syntax 
The command-syntax on Microsoft Windows and ReactOS is:

 type [Drive:][Path]FileName

[Drive:][Path]FileName – This parameter specifies the location and name of the file or files to view. Multiple file names need to be separated with spaces.
/? – This parameter displays help for the command.

Examples 
C:\>type "my report.txt" 

C:\>type *.txt

See also
List of DOS commands
List of Unix commands

References

Further reading

External links

 type | Microsoft Docs

CP/M commands
Internal DOS commands
MSX-DOS commands
OS/2 commands
ReactOS commands
Windows commands
Microcomputer software
Windows administration